USS Trumbull may refer to the following ships of the United States Navy:

 , a shoal-draft row galley built on Lake Champlain at Skenesboro, New York
 , one of the 13 frigates authorized by the Continental Congress on 13 December 1775.
 , an 18 gun sloop-of-war constructed by Naval Agent Joseph Howland between 1799 and 1800.

References 

United States Navy ship names